is a former Japanese football player. She played for Japan national team.

Club career
Yamazaki was born in Tokyo on June 29, 1980. She played for Nippon TV Beleza and Okayama Yunogo Belle. She retired in 2006.

National team career
On May 31, 2000, when Yamazaki was 19 years old, she debuted for Japan national team against Australia. She played 7 games for Japan until 2001.

National team statistics

References

1980 births
Living people
Association football people from Tokyo
Japanese women's footballers
Japan women's international footballers
Nadeshiko League players
Nippon TV Tokyo Verdy Beleza players
Okayama Yunogo Belle players
Women's association football defenders